Rear-Admiral James George Mackenzie (1803? – 25 February 1879) was a Royal Navy officer. He was Governor of the Falkland Islands from 1862 to 1866 and Lieutenant Governor of Saint Christopher from 1867 to 1869.

References 

Royal Navy admirals
People from Surat
Royal Navy personnel of the Crimean War
Governors of the Falkland Islands
1879 deaths
Governors of British Saint Christopher
Year of birth uncertain